The 1st Executive Council of the People's Republic of Croatia was that state's executive branch of government in 1953.

Background
The Central Committee of the Communist Party of Yugoslavia held its V. Plenum in May 1952 when a new Constitutional Law was proposed. On 13 January 1953 the National Assembly adopted a new Constitutional Law on the Basics of Social and Political Organization of the Federal People's Republic of Yugoslavia and Federal Governing Organs. The law established a new Federal Executive Council as the executive branch of government. The constituent republics subsequently adopted matching laws. On 5 February 1953 the Parliament of the People's Republic of Croatia adopted the Constitutional Law of the People's Republic of Croatia on the Basics of Social and Political Organization and Republican Governing Organs which created the republic's new Executive Council. The following day the Parliament adopted an enabling law for the new Constitutional Law, and then proceeded to elect the first Executive Council.

The Executive Council organized elections to the Parliament, now divided into a Republican Council and a Council of Producers, on 22 November 1953. A joint session of the two newly elected legislative councils elected a new Executive Council on 18 December 1953. Vladimir Bakarić was replaced by Jakov Blažević as president of the Executive Council, while he moved to the position of President of the Parliament.

Members

References

Bibliography

Socialist Republic of Croatia
League of Communists of Croatia
Cabinets established in 1953
Cabinets disestablished in 1953